Pablo Ruiz Barrero (born 25 February 1981 in Seville, Andalusia) is a Spanish former professional footballer who played as a central defender.

External links

1981 births
Living people
Spanish footballers
Footballers from Seville
Association football defenders
La Liga players
Segunda División players
Segunda División B players
Sevilla Atlético players
Sevilla FC players
Real Murcia players
Córdoba CF players
FC Cartagena footballers
CE Sabadell FC footballers
UEFA Cup winning players